Nedelcho Lazarov Kolev (born 26 March 1953 in Kableshkovo) is a Bulgarian Olympic, European and World Weightlifting Champion. He had success at the 1980 Summer Olympics in Moscow and won 6 gold medals at the world championships in Manila and Havana, Cuba. He has worked as chief coach for the national teams of Bulgaria, Bahrain, India, Thailand and Indonesia. From 1965 to 1980 he competed only for CSKA Sofia club. His coaches were Angel Akrabov and Zdravko Koev. In the national team of Bulgaria was trained by Ivan Abadzhiev. Kolev has won a total of 29 medals from the Olympic Games, World and European Championships in total, snatch and clean and jerk - 11 gold, 11 silver and 7 bronze. He has set 16 world records - 11 for men and 5 for juniors. He was elected Athlete of the Year of Bulgaria for 1973.

Kolev is the father of singer Ruth Koleva.

Kolev is the president of the Bulgarian weightlifting federation.

References

External links
 
 

1953 births
Living people
Bulgarian male weightlifters
Olympic weightlifters of Bulgaria
Olympic bronze medalists for Bulgaria
Olympic medalists in weightlifting
Weightlifters at the 1980 Summer Olympics
Medalists at the 1980 Summer Olympics
European Weightlifting Championships medalists
People from Burgas Province
20th-century Bulgarian people